Saraswati Vidya Mandir may refer to:
 Saraswati Vidya Mandir - Jharkhand Kadipur Sultanpur- 228145 | Hindi/English medium school | UP Board
 Kailash Roy Saraswati Vidya Mandir, Jhumri Telaiya, a school of Koderma
 Saraswati Shishu Vidya Mandir (Dhurwa), English medium school affiliated to the CBSE, Delhi 
 Saraswati Vidya Mandir, Bokaro, English school affiliated to the Central Board of Secondary Education, New Delhi
 Saraswati Vidya Mandir Inter College, Barabanki, a Hindi school affiliated to the Uttar Pradesh Board of High School and Intermediate Education
 Saraswati Shishu Vidya Mandir-9D, Bokaro, affiliated to the CBSE